The 2013 European U23 Judo Championships is an edition of the European U23 Judo Championships, organised by the European Judo Union. It was held in Samokov, Bulgaria from 15 to 17 November 2013.

Medal summary

Medal table

Men's events

Women's events

Source Results

References

External links
 

European U23 Judo Championships
 U23
European Championships, U23
International sports competitions hosted by Bulgaria
Judo
Judo, European Championships U23